The Josiah Macy Jr. Foundation, or Macy Foundation, is a philanthropic foundation founded in 1930 by Kate Macy Ladd (1863–1945) in honor of her father, Josiah W. Macy Jr.  The current president is Holly Humphrey, MD, MACP.

History 
Since 1930, the Josiah Macy Jr. Foundation has worked to improve health care in the United States. Founded by Kate Macy Ladd in memory of her father, prominent philanthropist Josiah Macy Jr., the Foundation originally focused its initiatives on medical research. It was not until the 1950s that Macy began to focus on medical education as a means for improving health care.

Since the mid-1970s, the overwhelming majority of the Foundation’s grants have supported projects that broaden and improve health professional education. Today it is the only national foundation solely dedicated to improving the education of health professionals.

Overview 
The Foundation frequently hosts conferences and briefings that convene experts and leaders in the area of medical education. The Macy Foundation became internationally known for the support of the Macy conferences starting in the late 1940s : a series of interdisciplinary meetings of scientists, which played an important role in the foundation of cybernetics.

See also 
 Macy conferences
 MKULTRA

References

External links 
 

 
Organizations established in 1930
Non-profit organizations based in New York City
1930 establishments in New York City